Yoga (योग), a Sanskrit word with a general meaning of "connection, conjunction, attachment, union": a generic term for several physical, mental, and spiritual disciplines originating in ancient India.

Yoga may also refer to:

Sanskrit word
Yoga 
Yoga (philosophy), one of the six schools of Hindu philosophy
Raja Yoga, a term originally referring to samadhi, but was redefined by Vivekananda
Hatha Yoga, a system of physical postures, pranayama and visualization that is partly derived from tantra
Yoga as exercise, the worldwide form of exercise derived from Hatha Yoga during the 20th century
Three Yogas, a concept of three alternate paths to moksha (liberation of soul) in Hinduism
Asrava, an activity of the mind or body, a cause of Karma in Jainism
Yoga (Hindu astrology), the term for "conjunction" in Hindu astrology 
in Sanskrit grammar, a grammatical  construction  or application of a rule in the Ashtadhyayi

Similar words:
Yuga, an age or epoch in Hindu chronology

Japanese words
Yōga, Tokyo (用賀), a neighbourhood of Tokyo
Yōga Station (用賀駅), a railway station on the Tokyu Den-en-toshi Line located in Tokyo
Yōga (art) (洋画, literally "Western-style paintings")

Other uses
 Yoga (fish), a genus of gobiid fishes
 Lenovo Yoga, a computer brand
 "Yoga", an episode of the television series Teletubbies
 "Yoga" (Janelle Monáe and Jidenna song), a song by singer-songwriter Janelle Monáe and Jidenna
 "Yoga", a song by bbno$ from his album Eat Ya Veggies

See also

 Yog (disambiguation)
 Yogo (disambiguation)
 Joga (disambiguation)